The 1956 Georgia Tech Yellow Jackets football team represented the Georgia Institute of Technology during the 1956 NCAA University Division football season. The Yellow Jackets were led by 12th-year head coach Bobby Dodd and played their home games at Grant Field in Atlanta.

Georgia Tech was the preseason favorite to win the Southeastern Conference, but their hopes of reaching the Sugar Bowl were crushed when the Johnny Majors-led Tennessee Volunteers beat the Yellow Jackets in Atlanta, 0–6. Georgia Tech cruised through the rest of their schedule and finished the regular season with the Tennessee game as their only blemish, finishing second in the SEC and ranked number 4 in the country in the final AP Poll. They accepted an invitation to the 1956 Gator Bowl, where they beat Pittsburgh, in a rematch of the 1956 Sugar Bowl, 21–14. This was the sixth straight season for Georgia Tech that ended with a bowl victory. The team was selected national champion by both Berryman and Sagarin (ELO-Chess).

Schedule

References

Georgia Tech
Georgia Tech Yellow Jackets football seasons
Gator Bowl champion seasons
Georgia Tech Yellow Jackets football